Charlie Yin, better known by his stage name Giraffage, is an American electronic music record producer. Of Taiwanese descent, Yin grew up in San Jose, California, and graduated from the University of California, Berkeley, with a degree in Political Economics. He subsequently pursued his musical career, regularly performing as Giraffage at San Francisco Bay Area venues and around the world, independently and with other artists. Yin has collaborated with other electronic music producers, including Porter Robinson.

Giraffage has produced numerous remixes of pop and R&B tracks and several EPs, including No Reason, released on November 18, 2014. He has produced three full-length studio albums: Comfort in 2011; Needs in 2013; and Too Real, released on October 20, 2017.

Career 

Yin has performed as Giraffage at numerous locations worldwide, including the Boiler Room, Low End Theory, NYU Kimmel and more. His music has won praise from blogs such as Pitchfork, XLR8R, and The FADER. His songs have been described as "pleasantly ambient and sample-laden instrumentals", or "bedroom dream-pop", and feature "atmospheric pads ... familiar, hip-hop-flavored 808 percussion", "looping guitars, 808 thuds and clacks, and diced-up vocals". His music is compared with that of Shlohmo and Baths.

Giraffage released his debut EP Pretty Things in May 2011. He released his debut album, Comfort, later in 2011.

In 2012, he went on a 30-date European tour with Orlando producer XXYYXX after releasing the shared EP Even Though. In a review, The FADER wrote that Even Though "shines with swelling bass, surprise birdcalls and geysers of sound, like you tossed a penny in a well and $40 in quarters splashed up." Giraffage has also collaborated with other musicians, as he released the single "Move Me" with Jhameel and DWNTWN in 2013.

Giraffage signed to Alpha Pup Records in early 2013. In February 2013, he released his second album Needs. In fall 2013, he toured across the US in support of Phantogram. In February 2014, he remixed the entirety of The-Dream's Love/Hate LP, receiving approval from The FADER, who stated they could not "remember a moment of anticipation right before hitting the play button as happy as the one I just experienced." Among other festivals, he notably performed at Coachella in 2018, the Treasure Island Music Festival 2013, the Brooklyn Electronic Music Festival 2013, Decibel Festival 2013, What the Festival in Oregon in June 2014 and UCSD's Sun God Festival in May 2014. Amongst his international acts, he also performed at Beyond the Valley, Melbourne (Dec 2016) and Field Day, Sydney, Australia on 1st of Jan 2017 and had a considerable audience and a positive vibe.

Giraffage performed as the main support during Porter Robinson's "Worlds" tour of North America from August 28 to October 18, 2014. In November of that year he released the No Reason EP through Fool's Gold Records.

In July 2015, Giraffage collaborated with producer Viceroy and vocalist Patrick Baker on the song "Impression of You", released through Dim Mak Records.

In 2017, Giraffage signed to Counter Records (a label within the Ninja Tune family which is also home to ODESZA, RAC, Daktyl, Conner Youngblood, Laurel, etc.) for his third full-length album release. The album launched with first single "Slowly" ft. Matosic and was officially released on October 20, 2017, worldwide.

Previous projects 
Prior to Giraffage, Yin produced chiptune music under the moniker "Robot Science" in 2009 with the debut EP Doodads. He followed this up with Square in 2010 and Good Luck in 2011.

Discography

LPs
 Comfort (2011)
 Needs (2013)
 Too Real (2017)

EPs
 Pretty Things (2011)
 No Reason (2014)

Singles
 Even Though (with XXYYXX) (2012)
 Move Me (with Jhameel and DWNTWN) (2013)
 Impression of You (with Viceroy and Patrick Baker) (2015)
 Bring Me Your Love (2016)

Remixes 

(*The R. Kelly remix was later reworked into an original track entitled "Be With You" and included on the No Reason EP.)

References

External links
 

American electronic musicians
Record producers from California
University of California, Berkeley alumni
Living people
Counter Records artists
Year of birth missing (living people)